Katchal may refer to:

 Katchal Island, one of India's Nicobar Islands
 Katchal language, an Austroasiatic language spoken in the Nicobar Islands

See also
Katcha (disambiguation)
Katchalski (disambiguation)